Wega was a German fishing trawler that was built in 1931 as Walter Schües. She was sold and renamed Wega in 193. She was requisitioned by the Kriegsmarine in the Second World War initially service as Schiff 7 and later as a Vorpostenboot, serving as V 317 Wega. Returned to her owners post-war, she was scrapped in 1955.

Description
The engine was built by Christiansen & Meyer, Harburg, Germany. It was rated at 98nhp. It drove a single screw propeller via double reduction gearing and a low pressure turbine The turbine was built by Deutsche Schiff- und Maschinenbau, Bremen, Germany.

History
Walter Schües was built as yard number 245 by Schiffsbau Gesellschaft Unterweser AG, Unterweser Germany for the Hochseefischerei Carl Kämpf Partenreederei, Wesermünde. She was launched on 23 December 1931 and completed on 2 February 1932. The fishing boat registration PG 285 was allocated, as were the Code Letters KSBF. Her port of registry was Wesermünde. In March 1933, Walter Schües was sold to Nordstern AG. In 1934, her Code Letters were changed to DFAM.

Wega was requistioned on 4 September 1939. Deutsche Schiff- und Maschinenbau started her conversion for naval service the next day. On 29 November, she was commissioned into Kriegsmarine service as Schiff 7 Wega with 18 Vorpostengruppe. On 16 January 1940, she ran aground on the Langhoft Tonne, in the Baltic Sea. She was later refloated. On 18 May 1940, Schiff 7 Wega and the torpedo boat  escorted the steamship  from Stavanger to Bergen, Norway. Tyrifjord was transporting a heavy anti-aircraft battery. Other escorting vessels were Achilles, Schiff 18 and two vorpostenboote from 15 Vorpostenflotille. On 26 May, Schiff 7 Wega sailed to Molde, where she acted as a harbour protection vessel.

On 3 October, 18 Vorpostengruppe was redesignated 18 Vorpostenflotille. On 26 January 1941, Schiff 7 Wega stopped the Finnish steamship , which was on a voyage from Petsamo, Finland to Buenos Aires, Argentina. Pluto was escorted in to Vardø, Norway. On 30 January, she stopped the Finnish steamship , which was on a voyage from New York, United States to Petsamo. She was also escorted in to Vardø. Two days later, Schiff 7 Wega stopped the Finnish steamship , which was on a voyage from Petsamo to Cuba. Tauriwas escorted in to Vardø. On 5 February, she stopped the Finnish steamship , which was on a voyage from Petsamo to Buenos Aires. She was escorted in to Vardø. All three were escorted in to Vardø.

On 1 July 1942, Schiff 7 Wega was allocated to 9 Vorpostenflotille. On 1 May 1943, she was allocated to 3 Vorpostenflotille. From August 1943 to April 1944 she underwent a rebuild at Norderwerft. On 27 April 1944, she was redesignated V 317 Wega. On 3 September 1945, she arrived at Seebeckwerft, Bremen for decommissioning. She was subsequently returned to her owners. From 1 February 1948, her port of registry was Bremerhaven. Wega arrived at  W. Ritscher, Hamburg for scrapping on 30 August 1955 and was scrapped during September.

References

Sources

1931 ships
Ships built in Bremen (state)
Fishing vessels of Germany
Steamships of Germany
Auxiliary ships of the Kriegsmarine
Maritime incidents in January 1940
Steamships of West Germany
Fishing vessels of West Germany